Henley Brook is an outer rural suburb of Perth, Western Australia, part of the Swan Valley wine region.  The Ellen brook and Swan River meet in the northeastern corner of the suburb.  This is also the farthest upstream Captain Stirling's 1827 exploration reached before deciding on the settlement site of the new colony in 1829.  The All Saints Church, the oldest church in Western Australia, is also at this site.

The West Australian Reptile Park is a local tourist attraction.

Schools
In 2024 there will be a new school in Henley Brook called Henley Brook South Primary School (planning name). It will cater for 430 students and be built at a cost of $26.35 million.

Transport
Henley Brook is the site of the former Ellenbrook transfer station and the current Henley Brook bus station.

Drumpellier Drive along Henley Brook's western border is the main route into Perth. Gnangara Road along the suburb's northern border is the main route west.

References 

Suburbs of Perth, Western Australia
Suburbs and localities in the City of Swan